On June 3, 2004, thirteen United States space advocacy groups, industry associations and space policy organizations formed an umbrella organization known as the Space Exploration Alliance. The primary purpose of the SEA is to support the White House's plan to refocus NASA's human space activities toward exploration beyond low Earth orbit.

This effort, officially known as the Vision for Space Exploration was announced on January 15, 2004 by President George W. Bush at NASA Headquarters. The VSE includes plans for a return to the Moon by U.S. astronauts with the intent of establishing a permanent lunar base before follow-on efforts are made to move on to Mars and beyond.

The organizations involved in supporting the Space Exploration Alliance include:

Aerospace Industries Association
Aerospace States Association
American Astronautical Society
American Institute of Aeronautics and Astronautics
California Space Authority
Federation of Galaxy Explorers
Florida Space Authority
Global Space Travelers
The Mars Society
The Moon Society
NASA Alumni League
National Coalition of Spaceport States
National Society of Black Engineers
National Space Society
The Planetary Society
Pro Space
Space Generation Foundation
Space Studies Institute
X PRIZE Foundation

Collectively these groups total almost one million Americans as members or as employees of member companies.

History
The first goal of the SEA was to work toward receiving broad Congressional support for the new national Vision for Space Exploration outside low Earth orbit, which the SEA refers to as "Moon, Mars and Beyond". The SEA began their effort by working together on a "Moon-Mars Blitz" campaign on Capitol Hill in Washington, D.C. that was held during the week of July 11 through July 13, 2004.

Thousands of signed petitions from NSS members to their representatives and senators were presented during the congressional visits. The connection between local grassroots organization and a focused national effort was a critical link behind the "Moon-Mars Blitz" to secure first-year funding for the Vision for Space Exploration initiative, which the SEA viewed as a necessary first step for in-depth planning of the exploration program to commence in earnest.

A second "Moon-Mars Blitz" was held on May 17 through May 19, 2005 in conjunction with the National Space Society's annual International Space Development Conference with similar results.

After the September 19, 2005 announcement of NASA's Exploration Systems Architecture Study at a press conference hosted by NASA Administrator Michael Griffin, SEA is preparing a strategy designed to refute false media perceptions that a return to the Moon, Mars and Beyond is too expensive for the American taxpayer to undertake in view of the recent devastation caused along the Gulf Coast states by Hurricane Katrina and Hurricane Rita. 

The strategy has not been without some dissension within the ranks; in a press release issued on October 15, 2005, the Space Frontier Foundation announced its intent to leave the Alliance, citing "philosophical differences" and an unwillingness to become "a fan club for a status quo that has failed so miserably time after time in our nation's quest for space."

Nevertheless, the SEA plans to demonstrate how modest, but steady growth in national expenditures on space exploration and development can move the nation toward these important goals, and the benefits those expenditures will provide.

As space activity becomes increasingly integrated into every aspect of life here on earth, the SEA intends to show how this new focus on exploration will provide myriad advances in science and technology, untold economic opportunity and serve as an inspiration to our nation's youth. Given those benefits and the many more that lie in store, this new program of human space exploration beyond low earth orbit is a vital link to the future of the United States and the world.

See also

Space colonization
Vision for Space Exploration

References

External links
Official website

2004 establishments in the United States
Non-profit organizations based in the United States
Space advocacy organizations
Organizations established in 2004
Space policy